Bridgewater Jerry is a fog formation that occasionally appears over the River Derwent in Hobart, Tasmania and down the Derwent Valley. It is named after the suburb of Bridgewater, and the word "jerry" may have come from convict slang for 'fog' or 'mist'. It was probably first described in 1821, when Governor Lachlan Macquarie was stranded at Austin's Ferry because of fog.

The Bridgewater Jerry forms at night during the cooler months when cold air comes down the surrounding hills as katabatic winds and collects in the Derwent Valley.

During winter, the Bridgewater Jerry occurs once or twice a week.

See also

References

Hobart
Fog